The Honourable John Hale (1765 – 24 December 1838) was a member of the Legislative Council of Lower Canada.

He was born in England.  He entered into the Royal Marines in 1776 and became a lieutenant in the 2nd Foot Regiment in 1779, and then captain.  He was the military secretary of Prince Edward Augustus and accompanied him to Halifax, Nova Scotia.  After a brief return to England, he went to Quebec City in 1799 and eventually became inspector-general of public accounts in 1807.  In 1819 he acquired the seigneurie of Sainte-Anne-de-La-Pérade.  He was president of a bank from 1821 to 1823.

In 1799, he married Elizabeth Frances Amherst.

He was a member of the Legislative Council of Lower Canada from 1808 until its dissolution in 1838 in the wake of the Lower Canada Rebellion, and was its deputy speaker on several occasions.  He replaced John Caldwell as receiver-general in 1823, until his death in Quebec City.

His brother Edward and his son (also named Edward) served on the Special Council that ushered in the Act of Union.

He wrote Observations on crickets in Canada.

External links

1765 births
1838 deaths
Members of the Legislative Council of Lower Canada
18th-century Royal Marines personnel
Anglophone Quebec people